is a railway station in the city of Chita, Aichi, Japan, operated by Meitetsu.

Lines

Station layout
The station has two opposed side platforms connected by a level crossing. Both platforms can handle trains of six carriages. Platform 1 used to be able to handle trains of only four carriages, however a platform extension work has been completed in 2019.  The station is unattended.

Platforms

Adjacent stations

Station history
Komi Station was opened on February 18, 1912 as a station on the Aichi Electric Railway Company. The Aichi Electric Railway became part of the Meitetsu group on August 1, 1935. In January 2005, the Tranpass system of magnetic fare cards with automatic turnstiles was implemented, and the station has been unattended since that point.

Passenger statistics
In fiscal 2017, the station was used by an average of 3,241 passengers daily (boarding passengers only).

Surrounding area
Komi Post Office
Japan National Route 155

See also
 List of Railway Stations in Japan

References

External links

 Official web page 

Railway stations in Japan opened in 1912
Railway stations in Aichi Prefecture
Stations of Nagoya Railroad
Chita, Aichi